Lemon, lime and bitters (LLB) is a mixed drink made with (clear) lemonade (Sprite etc.), lime cordial, and Angostura bitters.  The lemonade is sometimes substituted with soda water or lemon squash, which is more akin to what is called "lemonade" in North America. 

Angostura LLB is also now available as a beverage in a can. This is available in the United States, Canada, Australia, New Zealand, Trinidad and Tobago, Barbados and elsewhere throughout the Caribbean, where the beverage's popularity has increased since its introduction in the region in the mid 2010s. 

It was served as a non-alcoholic alternative to "Pink Gin" (gin mixed with Angostura bitters).

An ABC News article published in 2018 described lemon, lime and bitters as "Australia's national drink".

It is often regarded as a non-alcoholic cocktail (or mocktail) due to its exceedingly low alcohol content, though some  establishments regard it as alcoholic and will not serve it without identification or proof of age.

History
The exact origin of lemon, lime and bitters is unknown, however it is claimed to have been invented and popularized within Australia sometime around 1880. Consequently, LLB is commonly consumed in Australia and New Zealand where it became customary for golf players to have a drink of LLB after a match of golf.

It is made to order in most bars but a pre-mixed version is made by a number of soft drink companies and is widely available in supermarkets.

See also
Gunner (cocktail) - a similar Hong Kong drink, with ginger ale, lemon juice and bitters.
List of cocktails

References

Non-alcoholic mixed drinks
Australian alcoholic drinks
Australian drinks
New Zealand alcoholic drinks
New Zealand drinks
Cocktails with bitters
Lemon-lime sodas